Wintergatan is the debut album from eponymous Swedish folktronica band Wintergatan, released on 24 April 2013.

Track listing

Credits
Wintergatan
 Martin Molin – vibraphone, music box, accordion, keyboards
 Evelina Hägglund – keyboards
 David Zandén – bass, keyboards
 Marcus Sjöberg – drums

References

2013 debut albums